Jani Leino (born March 15, 1990) is a Finnish ice hockey player. He is currently a free agent having last played for Vire in the 3. divisioona.

Leino played two games in the SM-liiga for Tappara during the 2008–09 SM-liiga season.

References

External links

1990 births
Living people
KOOVEE players
Lempäälän Kisa players
Tappara players
Finnish ice hockey centres
People from Hämeenlinna
Sportspeople from Kanta-Häme